Seiko is the seventeenth and first internationally released studio album by Japanese singer-songwriter Seiko (Seiko Matsuda). It was released on June 7, 1990, by CBS Sony, Columbia Records, and Epic Records. After gaining nationwide success in the 1980s, Matsuda took to the international market, especially the United States and the United Kingdom. She originally intended to release her first English-language studio album Sound of My Heart internationally, however, the plan was scrapped and the album was released exclusively in Hong Kong and Japan to a commercial success, peaking at number two on the Oricon Weekly Albums chart.

The album has spawned three singles. The first single from the album, "All the Way to Heaven" was released on April 30, 1990. "The Right Combination" was released on July 15, 1990, as the second single. The song, which features the guest vocal by Donnie Wahlberg, a member of the boy band New Kids on the Block, has been the most internationally successful song on Matsuda's discography, charting in the United Kingdom, Australia, Canada, and Japan, as well as peaking at number fifty-four in the United States. It was the first time in ten years for Japanese artists to chart on the Billboard Hot 100 since Yellow Magic Orchestra's "Computer Game" reached number sixty in 1980. The third single from the album, "Who's That Boy" was released in the United States on October 1, 1990.

Commercially, the album was a moderate success, peaking at number two in Japan and has sold over 500,000 copies worldwide.

Track listing

Charts

References

1990 albums
Seiko Matsuda albums
English-language Japanese albums
Albums produced by Giorgio Moroder
Sony Music Entertainment Japan albums